Brandlesholme Old Hall is a Grade II* listed privately owned historic house in Brandlesholme, Bury, Greater Manchester.

History 
The Hall was owned by the Greenhalgh family for eleven generations. John Greenhalgh (d.1651) was appointed Governor of the Isle of Man in 1640 by James Stanley, 7th Earl of Derby. His estates were seized by parliamentary authorities. On the death of Henry Greenhalgh in 1728 it passed to the Matthews family who sold it in the 1770s to the merchant Richard Powell of Heaton Norris, Stockport. The hall was sold at auction in 2018.

Architecture 
The building was originally an open-hall cruck-framed house, originating in the 13th century, later remodelled in the 16th century and again in 1849. The south end was dismantled and rebuilt in 1852 and was repaired in 1908. It has 19th century moulded oriel windows and the tall l½-storey range with steep slate roof contains the medieval hall.

Externally, the house preserves little of its ancient appearance, but the interior exhibits a good deal of the timber construction. The hall preserves its wide open fireplace and has a wide, well-formed 16th or 17th century upper cruck frame.

The site also includes a Grade II listed cruck barn from the 16th century and a Grade II listed barn dating from c.1830.

See also
Listed buildings in Tottington, Greater Manchester

References 

Buildings and structures in Bury, Greater Manchester
Buildings and structures in the Metropolitan Borough of Bury
Buildings and structures in Greater Manchester